Franz Xaver Eggert (11 November 1802 – 14 October 1876) was a German glass painter.

Life
Eggert was born at Höchstädt on the Danube, and studied decorative painting at Augsburg and Munich; but he afterwards devoted himself entirely to glass-painting, in conjunction with Ainmiller, Hammerl, and Kirchmair, and endeavoured to raise the art from its long decline. He especially distinguished himself by the magnificence of his ornamentation. His best works are in the new church of the suburb Au at Munich, in the cathedrals of Cologne and Ratisbon, and in several churches at Basle, Constance, etc. In 1840 he designed a scheme of stained glass windows depicting various saints at Christ Church, Kilndown in the English county of Kent.  He died at Munich in 1876.

See also
 List of German painters

References

Sources
 

1802 births
1876 deaths
19th-century German painters
19th-century German male artists
German male painters
German stained glass artists and manufacturers
People from Dillingen (district)